"Chacarron" (often known as "Chacarron Macarron") is a song by Panamanian artists Rodney Clark (El Chombo) and Andres de la Cruz (also known as Andy's Val Gourmet).

It is a reworking of the original version from 2003 by Andy's Val Gourmet, who is credited as 'Andy's Val' on the release. A cover by Yahari appears as the first track of their 2005 album Las + Bailables de .... Yahari.

El Chombo and Andy's Val Gourmet's version reached the top 20 on the UK Singles Chart in December 2006.

The song was used as walk up music before at bats by José Reyes when he played for the New York Mets. The song is included in the 2021 dance video game Just Dance 2022.

Internet popularity
The song gained attention online when the chorus was used on a YTMND page by the name of "Ualuealuealeuale" which was created in 2005. It contained a .gif of Batman played by Adam West being drugged in a scene from the 1966 series' first episode. The page also gained popularity on YouTube with a reupload of it gaining millions of views.

"Chacarron Macarron" became viral on the Internet owing to its nonsensical lyrics and odd music video. The lyrics consist of gibberish. The "uale" noise earned de la Cruz (Andy Val) the nickname of "The Mute" ("El Mudo" in Spanish), but due to a mispronunciation, he also earned the nickname of "El Mundo", and the song was subsequently used in numerous viral videos and YouTube Poops during the late 2000s and onward. One particular video involved a loop of Nintendo character Mario headbanging from a Singapore Airlines advertisement. The song was also used as part of the Hurr-Durr javascript trojan in 2009.

Charts

References

2003 songs
2005 singles
2006 singles
Novelty songs
El Chombo songs
Warner Music Group singles
Gibberish language
Internet memes introduced in 2005